Newark High School is a public high school in Newark, Delaware, and is one of three high schools within the Christina School District. It is one of the oldest educational institutions in the state, graduating its first class of students in 1893. In 2009, it saw its 20,000th student graduate.

Newark has been named by Newsweek magazine as one of their "Top Schools in America."  In 2006 Newark was ranked #521,  in 2007 it was #271,  and in 2008 it was #1041.  This list represents the top 5% of the schools in the nation based on the number of AP, IB, and Cambridge exams taken divided by students graduating. The school was also named a GRAMMY Signature School in 2010 by the GRAMMY Foundation for its outstanding commitment to music education. Newark won the DIAA Sportsmanship Award in 2003, 2004, 2005, and 2006.

The school serves a portion of Wilmington. In the suburbs it serves almost all of Newark, most of Brookside, and the Christina School District portions of North Star, Pike Creek, and Pike Creek Valley. Within Wilmington it serves the Church Street Historic District.

Demographic information

All information for this section can be found at the Delaware School profile page.

Students

 As of the 2012-2013 school year the student to teacher ratio was 16 to 1.
 As of the 2012-2013 school year the percentage of students listed as "English language learner" was 2.5% (down 0.8% compared to the previous year).
 As of the 2012-2013 school year 48% of the student population was listed as "low income" (up 4.7% compared to the previous year).
 As of the 2012-2013 school year 8.1% of the student population was listed as "special education" (up 1.1% compared to the previous year).

Faculty

 As of the 2011-2012 school year 111 teachers/instructional staff were allocated for NHS.
 As of the 2011-2012 school year all teachers/instructional staff were deemed "highly qualified" by the State of Delaware.
 As of the 2011-2012 school year 46.0% of the instructional staff held a master's degree or higher.
 As of the 2011-2012 school year 6.1% of the instructional staff were NBPTS (National Board for Professional Teaching Standards) certified.

Academics

Newark State Testing scores (10th grade)

 Rankings are created by The News Journal and are not used by DOE for classification.  They are computed based on the DSTP performances by all Delaware Public High Schools, so while an individual school may score higher or lower from year to year, the ranking indicates how other schools did on the same exam.
 DSTP transitioned to a new web-based test called DCAS in 2011.  A new scoring system was developed since the test was taken three times over the course of the school year.

Newark SAT scores

 Class of '11, '12, and '13 scores will include the scores of all students at the school.  One of the features of Delaware's successful Race to the Top application was that all public school students would have a special SAT given during school to 11th graders during the month of April (see below).

Newark School Day SAT scores

Newark AP Exam scores

 In 2005, 2006, 2011, and 2012 the Christina School District paid the registration fees for any student currently enrolled in an AP class who wished to take the exam.

America's Top Schools Ranking (calculated by Newsweek and The Daily Beast)

 Advanced Placement courses offered are English Language, French Language, Human Geography, Spanish Language, Statistics, Calculus AB, Calculus BC, Music Theory, World History, English Literature, US History, European History, AP Biology, Physics B, American Government and Politics, Chemistry, Environmental Science, Psychology, Macroeconomics, and Microeconomics.
 In order to make Advanced Placement courses available to all students (and to encourage students to take the exam), the Christina School District paid the Registration fee for all exams in 2005 and 2006.  This has resulted in a surge of new courses being offered while also increasing the number of students enrolled in the various AP programs.  These changes are reflected in Newark's inclusion on Newsweek's "Top Schools In America" list for the first time in March 2006.  Newark's ranking rose nearly 200 places the following year, when Newsweek published the 2007 rankings in May.
 The school remained on Newsweeks "Top Schools" list in 2008, even after the district discontinued the payment program. Newark's AP program was featured in a December 2006 News Journal article discussing the rise in students from all groups taking the test.
 Starting with the 2007 tests (2006-2007 school year), students had to pay the registration fee(s) on their own unless they have a "special financial situation" that precludes them from affording the test.  In such a case, the district will make-up the cost of registration.
 Newark also has a large cadre of students involved in the Cambridge Program.  The program began during the 2006-2007 school year in ninth grade and expanded to include tenth grade the following year.  Newark is the first (and only) Delaware High School to have such a program.  Newark's participation in this program was highlighted in a January 2007 News Journal article.  Cambridge participation stopped counting as part of the Newsweek calculation in 2009.
 Newark has been a PBS (Positive Behavior Support) school since 2005 and an AVID school since 2008.

Athletics
State Championship Victories since 1942 (39 total) - Blue Hen Conference "Flight A" school 
Football (1976, 1984, 1985, 1997, 1998, 1999, 2000, 2001, 2003, and 2004)
 NHS football last reached the state championship game in 2011 (lost).
 Currently is the all-time leader state championship victories.
 Coach Butch Simpson currently holds the state record for most career coaching victories in football (257) - active streak 
Girls' swimming and diving  (1978, 1980, 1981, 1989, 1990, 1992, 2003, and 2004)
Baseball (1970, 1971, 1974, 1984, 1990, and 1996)
 NHS baseball last reached the state championship game in 2003 and 2004 (lost both).
Volleyball (1976, 1981, 1982, 1983, 1984, and 1990)
Boys' basketball (1982, 1987, and 1990)
 NHS basketball last reached the state championship game in 2011 (lost).
Boys' cross country (1962, 1971)
 NHS Boys' cross country finished 2nd in the DIAA Championship in 2002, 2012 and 2013.
Boys' swimming and diving (2005)
Boys' indoor track and field (2004)
Boys' tennis (1996)
Softball (1977)

Feeder pattern
In 1988 Wilmer E. Shue Middle School fed into Newark High, but it was physically located within the Christina High attendance boundary, while no middle schools were physically in the Newark High attendance boundary.

Trivia
 Krawen (the name of the yearbook) is "Newark" backwards.
 Newark H.S. received national attention in October 2005 when two members of the Philadelphia Eagles promoted a Christian concert during a school-sanctioned assembly.  Although not planned, the resulting fervor led to NHS being the center of a 1st Amendment (public schools and religious expression) debate.
 This Wikipedia entry was featured in the October 2006 edition of NEA Today.  The article was entitled "Getting Wiki With It."

Notable alumni

Melissa Bulanhagui (2008), figure skater
Malcolm Bunche (2009), football player
Colin Burns (1999) retired American soccer goalkeeper
Vincenza Carrieri-Russo (2002), beauty pageant winner, nonprofit founder, entrepreneur 
George V. Chalmers (1927), college athlete
Katherine Ciesinski (1968), mezzo-soprano
Zach Clark (2001), minor league baseball player
Brandy Davis (1941), former MLB player
Chris Dunn (1968), 1972 Olympic high jumper
Robert W. Gore (1955), inventor of Gore-Tex
Kwame Harris (2000), former NFL player
Orien Harris (2001), former NFL player
Conway Hayman (1967), former NFL player
Gary Hayman (1969), former NFL player
Cristina Henríquez (1995), American author best known for her 2014 novel The Book of Unknown Americans
Brian Lesher (1989), former MLB player
Jack Markell (1978), governor of Delaware
Derrick May (1986), former MLB player
Rich Parson (1998), football player
David Raymond (1975), former (and original) Phillie Phanatic
Terence Stansbury (1979), former NBA player
Paul Tulley (1960), film and television actor
Johnny Weir (2002), 2006 and 2010 Olympic figure skater, three-time National Champion
Vic Willis (1896), former MLB player, inducted into the Baseball Hall of Fame in 1995

References

External links
 

High schools in New Castle County, Delaware
Educational institutions established in 1893
Public high schools in Delaware
1893 establishments in Delaware